Kaluga is an impact crater located in Kaluga Oblast of the Central Federal District, Russia.

It is 15 km in diameter and the age is estimated to be 380 ± 5 million years old (Upper Devonian). The crater is buried under 800 m of sediments; it not exposed at the surface.

References

Impact craters of Russia
Devonian impact craters
Landforms of Kaluga Oblast